is a Japanese title, often used in Japanese martial arts.

Meaning 
The word means „assisting instructor“ or „assisting teacher“ and is usually used as an honorific title to designate an official inexperienced instructor within an organization. An intermediate level instructor would have the title Shidōin and a senior instructor would have the title Shihan.

Origin 
Fuku is set as a suffix in front of the title and means deputy, representative, supporting or vice.
The word Shidōin descends from Shido (suru) . It consists of yubi 指 which means finger or sasu 指す which is the verb for showing. Michibiku  means guide or lead. Shido also stands for chivalry, the code of honor of the samurai.

Use 
Fuku Shidōin is the lowest of three honorary title. One level above is Shidōin,  „instructor“ or „teacher“. 

Different budo arts and dojos have several requirements for the usage of this title, but in general it corresponds to 2nd or 3rd Dan. Fuku Shidōinis used to specify the general title sensei. 

A senior instructor would have the title Shihan.

See also 
Japanese honorifics

References 

Titles and rank in Japanese martial arts